Erythrotrichia is a red algae genus in the family Erythrotrichiaceae. In Iceland, E. carnea is red listed as a vulnerable species (VU).

References

Red algae genera
Compsopogonophyceae